Glaeser is a surname. Notable people with the surname include:

Bertha Lund Glaeser (1862-1939), American physician
Edward Glaeser (born 1967), American economist
Ernst Glaeser (1902–1963), German author
Gotthelf Leberecht Glaeser (1784–1851), German painter
Matt Glaeser (born 1985), American soccer player and coach

See also
Glaser